Bire Akkar    is a small town in Akkar Governorate, Lebanon, close to the border with Syria.

The population in Bire Akkar is mainly Sunni Muslims.

History
In 1838, Eli Smith noted  the village,  whose inhabitants were Sunni Muslim, located east of esh-Sheikh Mohammed.

Health
Bire Akkar has a Polish Health Service close to the main road, which received support of the Kulczyk Foundation.

Thanks to the funding of Polish Aid, the donor arm of Polish Ministry of Foreign Affairs, PCPM (Polish Center For International Aid) has secured shelter for over 35,000 Syrian refugee families through conditional cash assistance to cover part of the rental fees for apartments or garages. 

In addition to shelter, PCPM aims at providing Syrian refugees with comprehensive assistance that includes access to health care and education, as well as lifesaving assistance during the winter season. A primary health care center in Bireh, located 4km from Syrian border, coupled with a mobile clinic, caters for over 10,000 patients annually. During the winter season of 2017-18, PCPM is one of four aid agencies in Lebanon that provides Syrian refugees with cash assistance for purchase of heating oil, stoves and blankets.

Sports 
The most recognizable sports in Bire Akkar are football and basketball.

References

Bibliography

External links
Bireh (Aakkar), Localiban 

Populated places in Akkar District
Sunni Muslim communities in Lebanon